Le lac des fées (The Fairy Lake) is a grand opera in five acts composed by Daniel Auber to a French libretto by Eugène Scribe and  Mélesville (the pen name of Anne-Honoré-Joseph Duveyrier). The story is set in the Harz Mountains and based on a German ballad. The opera was premiered by the Paris Opera at the Salle Le Peletier on 1 April 1839.

Roles

References
Notes

Sources
Charlton, David, The Cambridge Companion to Grand Opera, Cambridge University Press, 2003, pp 184–186. 
Chorley, Henry Fothergill, Modern German Music: Recollections and Criticisms, Smith, Elder, 1854, pp. 246–247.
Clément, Félix and Larousse, Pierre, "Lac des fées (Le)", Dictionnaire lyrique ou Histoire des opéras, Slatkine, 1999, p. 392 (in French). 
 Tamvaco, Jean-Louis (2000). Les Cancans de l'Opéra. Chroniques de l'Académie Royale de Musique et du théâtre, à Paris sous les deux restorations (2 volumes, in French). Paris: CNRS Editions. .

External links
 
 1839 libretto at Gallica
 Complete libretto in the original French from Œuvres complètes de M. Eugène Scribe (Volume 2), Furne, 1841, pp. 123–146.
 

Operas
Grand operas
1839 operas
Operas by Daniel Auber
French-language operas
Opera world premieres at the Paris Opera
Libretti by Eugène Scribe